Beqa Adamashvili (born 1990) is a Georgian blogger and writer. He studied at Caucasus University, and began publishing short stories on electronic platforms. His first novel Bestseller came out in 2014. In 2019, he won the EU Prize for Literature for his book Everybody Dies in the Novel.

In his professional life, Adamashvili is a creative director for the advertising agency Leavingstone.

References

Living people
1990 births
Writers from Georgia (country)